The People's Security Agency, or commonly abbreviated as BKR, was an Indonesian government agency established to undertake the task of maintaining security together with the people and the state offices. The BKR was formed by the Preparatory Committee for Indonesian Independence (PPKI) in its session on 22 August 1945 and announced by President Sukarno on the next day.

The establishment of the BKR was a change from the results of the PPKI session on 19 August 1945 that had previously planned the formation of the national army. The amendment was finally decided on 22 August 1945 not to form a national army. This decision is based on various political considerations.

The leaders of the time chose to take more diplomacy to gain recognition of the newly proclaimed independence. The armed Japanese occupation troops, complete with falling mental defeat, became a consideration as well, to avoid clashes when a national army was immediately formed.

Members of the BKR at that time were young Indonesians who had previously received military education as Heiho soldiers, Pembela Tanah Air (PETA), the Royal Netherlands East Indies Army (KNIL) and others. The central BKR headquarters was located in Jakarta, led by Moefreni Moekmin. Through official decree on 5 October 1945, the BKR was changed to the People's Security Forces (TKR) and, after several name changes, eventually became the Indonesian National Armed Forces.

Background
On 19 August 1945 in the PPKI session, two PPKI members Abikoesno Tjokrosoejoso and Oto Iskandar di Nata proposed the raising of a national defense force for the new republic. However, the proposal was rejected on the grounds that it could provoke clashes with the occupying Imperial Japanese Army who were still armed and invited the intervention of Allied troops who would disarm the Japanese army after the Surrender of Japan. The 344,000 Japanese troops throughout Indonesia were mentally devastated by losing the war. With an unstable mental state they were given the task by the allied forces to maintain security in Indonesia until their arrival in the lands of the new republic.

On August 20, 1945, the Family Assistance Service for Victims of War (BPKKP), was established and on August 22, 1945, the People's Security Agency (BKR), was formed, which was part of BPKKP, which was originally called the Assistant Maid Agency and later became the Assisting Defense Agency, or BPP. BPP already existed during the Japanese occupation of the Dutch East Indies and was responsible for maintaining the welfare of PETA and Heiho. But on August 18, 1945, four days before the formation of BKR, Japan disbanded PETA and Heiho. The responsibility to accommodate former PETA and Heiho members was handed to BPKKP.

Formation
President Sukarno on 23 August 1945 announced the establishment of BKR. The President made a speech by inviting youth volunteers, former members of PETA, Heiho, and the Imperial Japanese Navy to gather on August 24, 1945, in their respective regions.

In Jakarta, youth and former PETA successfully formulated the BKR structure in accordance with the territorial structure of the Japanese occupation. These youths call themselves BKR administrators at the central level consisting of Kaprawi, Sutaklasana, Latief Hendraningrat, Arifin Abdurrachman, Machmud and Zulkifli Lubis.

Meanwhile, the formation of BKR outside Jakarta was spearheaded by Arudji Kartawinata (West Java), Drg Mustopo (East Java), and Sudirman (Central Java). In addition to BKR Land, BKR Sea was also formed which was spearheaded by former students and teachers from the High School of Sailing and the sailors from the Shipping Service consisting of Mas Pardi, Adam, Eddy Martadinata and R Suryadi. Especially in West Java, Hidayat and Kartakusumah as former KNIL officers joined and led the BKR of the Central Bandung Railway Station and other railway stations.

Due to limited communication facilities at that time, not all regions in Indonesia know the formation of BKR. In eastern Sumatra and Aceh, BKR never formed. But generally the youths in the area formed an organization that would form the core of the army. In Aceh, youth established the Indonesian Youth Force (API), and youths in Palembang formed the People's Security Guard (PKR) or the People's Security Guard Agency (BPKR).

The youth who disagreed with the establishment of the BKR formed separate resistance organizations which generally supported the independence cause. In Bandung there was the Indonesian Youth Student Association (P3I), in Surabaya there was the Indonesian Young Generation (AMI), in Padang there is the Indonesian Youth Information Center (BPPI), and in South Kalimantan there was the Youth League of the Republic of Indonesia (BPRI).

All these independent regional formations formed the basis of the laskar groups that served as auxiliaries to the armed forces.

Formation of BKR Land Forces
On 29 August 1945 the Central Indonesian National Committee (KNIP) was established and authorized by the government. Then KNIP endorsed the establishment of the BKR Center in Jakarta. BKR Jakarta led by Moefreni Moekmin assisted by Priyatna, Soeroto Koento, Daan Yahya, Daan Mogot, Sujono and Latief Hendraningrat. In Bogor BKR was formed in October 1945 which was pioneered by former PETA members Husein Sastranegara and Ibrahim Adjie.

In Parahyangan, a BKR group was formed on August 28, 1945, and led by Arudji Kartawinata (former Daidan PETA in Cimahi) and Pardjaman (former Daidan PETA in Bandung). The establishment of BKR Parahyangan was followed by the formation of BKR groups in Garut, Tasikmalaya, Ciamis, Majalengka, and Purwakarta. BKR Lembang is led by Amir Machmud while BKR Sumedang is led by Umar Wirahadikusumah.

BKR groups were also established in other regions in Indonesia. In Central Java, BKR Purwokerto was led by Soedirman, while BKR Surakarta was led by GPH Djatikoesoemo. In Surabaya on August 24, 1945, a meeting was held to form BKR which was attended by Moestopo, Jonosewojo, Soengkono, and Sukarno. The result of the meeting decided to call the former members of PETA, Heiho and other youths to join BKR members on September 10, 1945.

Establishment of BKR Navy
The announcement of the establishment of BKR was also greeted enthusiastically by the youths who served in the marine sector, ex-Indonesian personnel of the Imperial Navy and the Royal Netherlands Navy, the employees of Jawa Unko Kaisha and the students and teachers of the High School of Sailing. They took the initiative to maintain order and security in port towns and cities.

Pioneered by Mas Pardi, the youths held meetings. The result of these meetings was the September 10, 1945 formation of the BKR Navy Center led by Mas Pardi and then endorsed by the Central Indonesian National Committee.

After getting the approval from the CINC BKR Navy personnel would later take over the Jawa Unko Kaisha building and buildings in Port of Tanjung Priok. The BKR Navy Center also issued instructions to youth sailors in the area to immediately establish a BKR Sea group in their respective areas.

Formation of BKR Air Force
The formation of BKR Air Force was spearheaded by former Dutch and Japanese aviators in the air base areas and assisted by youth who had never served in the field of aviation. The former Dutch aviators were former members of the Royal Netherlands East Indies Army Air Force, the Netherlands Naval Aviation Service and the Volunteer Fir Corps. In addition there were former Japanese aviators who served in the Nanpo Koku Kabusyiki and veterans of the Imperial Army and Navy, as well as Indonesian servicemen from these services.

References

External links
 

Military history of Indonesia
Indonesian National Revolution
Military of Indonesia
Government agencies of Indonesia